Mouloudia Club d'Alger, referred to as MC Alger or MCA for short, is an Algerian women's volleyball team that was founded on 1947, as a division of the of MC Alger. They play their home games in Hacène Harcha Arena, which has a capacity of 8,000 people. 
They were allocated one of two wildcard spots for the 2014 edition of FIVB Volleyball Women's Club World Championship held in Zurich, Switzerland after winning the African Championships.

History
From 2008 to 2020, the team was known as GS Pétroliers as it was part of the multi-sports club with that name.

The team's name changed back to MC Alger in 2020.

Previous Names
Mouloudia Chaâbia d'Alger (1947→1977)
Mouloudia Pétroliers d'Alger (1977→1988)
Mouloudia Club d'Alger (1988→2008)
Groupement Sportif des Pétroliers (2008–2020)

Team Roster
2013-2014

Technical and managerial staff

Honors

National Achievements
Algerian Championship :
 Winners (24 titles) : (1978, 1979, 1980, 1983, 1985, 1986, 1987, 1988, 1989, 1990, 1992, 1993, 1997, 1998, 2000, 2001, 2002, 2003, 2007, 2008, 2009, 2010, 2011, 2013)
 Runners up :

Algerian Cup :
 Winners (23x cups) : 
 Runners up (x vice champions) :

International Achievements
African Club Championship :
 Winners (1x title) : 2014
 Runners up (3x vice champions) : 2002, 2008, 2013

Head coaches

As of 2014

Notable players
 Amel Khamtache
 Fatima Zahra
 Narimene Madani
 Naïma Belabes
 Nassima Ben Hamouda
 Nawal Mansouri
 Salima Hammouche

External links
  Site officiel de Sonatrach (sections sport)

References

Groupement Sportif des Pétroliers
Algerian volleyball clubs
Volleyball clubs established in 1947
1947 establishments in Algeria
Sport in Algiers